Madaura may refer to:

the city of Madauros
Lucius Apuleius of Madaura